Trachelostenini is a tribe of darkling beetles in the family Tenebrionidae. There are at least three genera in Trachelostenini.

Genera
These genera belong to the tribe Trachelostenini:
 Leaus Matthews & Lawrence, 1992  (Australasia)
 Myrmecodema Gebien, 1943  (the Neotropics)
 Trachelostenus Solier, 1851  (the Neotropics)

References

Further reading

 
 

Tenebrionoidea